Félicien Menu de Ménil (16 July 1860 – 28 March 1930) was a French composer and Esperanto enthusiast best known for his musical setting of Ludwig Zamenhof's poem "La Espero". He was also the editor of and a contributor to La Revuo.

Works
 Menu de Ménil, Félicien, "La Mortigistoj de Stradella", short story  published in the magazine La Revuo, September 1906
 Menu de Ménil, Félicien, Muzika Terminaro, 1908
 Menu de Ménil, Félicien, Les préjuges contre l'espéranto, 1908
 Menu de Ménil, Félicien, L'Héritage Klodarec, one-act comedy, 1906

References
 Courtinat, Léon, Historio de esperanto: movado kaj literaturo, 1887–1960, Agen: Imprimerie Moderne, 1964–1966, 

Esperanto music
French composers
French male composers
French Esperantists
1860 births
1930 deaths